Overnight may refer to:

Film and broadcast media
 Overnight (1985 film), a Canadian comedy film
 Overnight (2003 film), 2003 documentary film
 NBC News Overnight, an American late night newscast from the early 1980s
 The Overnight, 2015 film
 Overnights (radio show), an Australian overnight radio program broadcast on ABC Local Radio

Music
Overnight, 2016 EP by Jake Miller
"Overnight", single and title track of Overnight EP by Jake Miller
"Overnight", 1958 single by Jim Reeves
"Overnight" (Bee Gees song), 1987
"Overnight", 1964 single by Margie Bowes
"Overnight", 1981 single by Mike Holoway
 Overnight (album)

Other
 'Overnight', informal term for the overnight rate interest rate, which large banks use to borrow and lend from one another on the overnight market

See also 
 
 
 Over (disambiguation)
 Night (disambiguation)